Nicolas Rohan Marley (born January 5, 1995) is a former American football linebacker. He played college football at Tulane and was signed by the Washington Redskins as an undrafted free agent in 2017. He is the son of former college football player Rohan Marley, grandson of the reggae musician Bob Marley, and half-brother of model Selah Marley.

Early years
Marley was born in Haiti and lived in Jamaica for two years before moving to Miami at the age of four. He then later attended Cypress Bay High School, where he was named first-team all-state as a senior with 67 tackles. In 2012 he was MVP of the Al Golden Summer Camp. He was rated a three-star college recruit by 247Sports.com and two-star by ESPN, Rivals.com, and Scout.com.

College career
Marley joined the Tulane Green Wave football team in 2013. It was the only NCAA D-I Football Bowl Subdivision institution to offer him a scholarship, and only two NCAA D-I Football Championship Subdivision institutions did. As a freshman, he was named Conference USA Co-Freshman of the Year and a member of the C-USA All-Freshman Team, with 67 tackles in 13 games. In 2014 he got an All-American Athletic Conference Honorable Mention with 82 tackles in 12 games. In 2015, he was named a member of the All-American Athletic Conference First-team, with 82 tackles in 12 games. In 2016, he was named again a member of the All-American Athletic Conference First-team, with 88 tackles in 12 games. He graduated in business management and marketing.

Professional career
On May 16, 2017, Marley signed with the Washington Redskins as an undrafted free agent. He was waived on September 2, 2017.

References

External links
Tulane Green Wave bio
Washington Football Team bio

1995 births
Living people
Haitian emigrants to the United States
People from Weston, Florida
American sportspeople of Jamaican descent
Sportspeople from Broward County, Florida
Players of American football from Florida
American football linebackers
Tulane Green Wave football players
Washington Redskins players
Marley family